Steen is a surname. Notable people with the surname include:

Alexander E. Steen, American military officer
Alexander Steen, Canadian-Swedish hockey player
Anitra Steen, Swedish politician
Anthony Steen, British politician
Cassandra Steen, German singer
Charles Steen, American geologist
David Steen (disambiguation), several people
Enoch Steen, U.S. Army officer, explorer 
Jan Steen (1626–1679), Dutch painter
Jessica Steen, Canadian actress
Joakim With Steen, Norwegian music producer
Johannes Steen, Norwegian politician
Kevin Steen (born 1984), Canadian wrestler now better known as Kevin Owens
Knut Steen (1924–2011), Norwegian sculptor
Marguerite Steen (1894–1975), British writer 
Matthew Landy Steen, American activist
Melvin Steen (1907–1992), American attorney
Peter Steen, Danish actor
Paprika Steen, Danish actress
Reiulf Steen, Norwegian politician
Robert Steen, Canadian politician
Steve Steen, British actor and comedian
Sverre Steen, Norwegian history professor
Terje Steen, Norwegian ice hockey player
Tyler Steen (born 2000), American football player
Thomas Steen, Swedish hockey player
Warren Steen, Canadian politician

See also
 Michael Stean (born 1953), English chess grandmaster

Danish-language surnames